The Customer of the Off Season is a 1970 Israeli drama film directed by Moshé Mizrahi. It was entered into the 20th Berlin International Film Festival.

Cast
 Claude Rich as Customer
 Henya Sucar-Ziv as Wife
 Hans Christian Blech as Hotel Manager
 Amos Kenan
 Uzi Weinberg

References

External links
 

1970 films
1970 drama films
Films directed by Moshé Mizrahi
1970s Hebrew-language films
Israeli drama films